The 2022 WAC men's basketball tournament is the postseason men's basketball tournament of the Western Athletic Conference (WAC) for the 2021–22 season. Held during March 8–12, 2022, in Paradise, Nevada, first-round games were played at the Michelob Ultra Arena with all remaining games at the Orleans Arena. The tournament champion, the  New Mexico State Aggies, received the conference's automatic bid to the 2022 NCAA tournament.

Seeds
11 of the 13 teams in the WAC were eligible to compete in the conference tournament. Dixie State and Tarleton State were ineligible due to their transition from Division II to Division I. Teams were seeded by record within the conference, with a tiebreaker system to seed teams with identical conference records. Only the top 10 teams in the conference qualified for the tournament. 

With Grand Canyon and Sam Houston State having split their regular-season head-to-head games, the tie for the fourth seed was broken by comparing the tied teams' records against teams that finished tied for the conference's best regular-season record but only including the team or teams Grand Canyon and Sam Houston State each played the same number of times. Grand Canyon played New Mexico State twice and Stephen F. Austin once. Sam Houston State played New Mexico State once and Stephen F. Austin twice. Therefore, the games Grand Canyon and Sam Houston State played against Seattle were used to break the tie, since each team played Seattle once.

Schedule

Bracket 

* denotes overtime period

References

Tournament
WAC men's basketball tournament
Basketball competitions in the Las Vegas Valley
College basketball tournaments in Nevada
WAC men's basketball tournament
WAC men's basketball tournament
College sports tournaments in Nevada